Ummathur  is a village in the southern state of Karnataka, India.This historical village was once a capital of Ummathur king during the Vijayanagara Empire It is located in the Chamarajanagar taluk of Chamarajanagar district in Karnataka. It is situated in the Kollegal - Nanjangud road and is the last village of the Santhe Marahalli Constituency.

Ummathur is a head village for nearby hamlets like Linganapura, Vomma, Hanumanapura.

Temples 
Ummathur has several notable old temples including a Jain Basadi.

Demographics
 India census, Ummathur had a population of 5231 with 2580 males and 2651 females.

See also
 Chamarajanagar
 Districts of Karnataka

References

External links
 http://Chamarajanagar.nic.in/

Villages in Chamarajanagar district